Irina Gennadyevna Selyutina (Ирина Геннадьевна Селютина; born 7 November 1979) is a former tennis player from Kazakhstan.

She is a former world No. 1 in junior doubles, winning French Open and Wimbledon in 1997, partnering with Cara Black. Black and Selyutina were also crowned ITF Junior Girls Doubles World Champion in 1997. Selyutina won three doubles titles on the WTA Tour – J&S Cup with Cătălina Cristea in 1999, Canberra Women's Classic with Nannie De Villiers and Porto Open with Black in 2002. She also enjoyed success on the ITF Women's Circuit, winning eight singles and 20 doubles events.

Personal life
Selyutina was born to Gennady and Tatyana Selyutina in Alma-Ata (Soviet Union then, Kazakhstan now). She has a brother, Nickolay. Selyutina began playing tennis at the age of eight, and has been coached by her first coach Valery Kovalyov for her entire career. She graduated from high school in 1996.

WTA career finals

Doubles: 5 (3 titles, 2 runner-ups)

ITF Circuit finals

Singles: 13 (8–5)

Doubles: 28 (20–8)

Awards
 1997 – ITF Junior Girls Doubles World Champion (with Cara Black)

Junior Grand Slam finals

Girls' doubles (2–0)

References

External links
 
 
 

1979 births
Kazakhstani female tennis players
Living people
Kazakhstani people of Russian descent
Wimbledon junior champions
Sportspeople from Almaty
Grand Slam (tennis) champions in girls' doubles
Tennis players at the 1998 Asian Games
Asian Games competitors for Kazakhstan
21st-century Kazakhstani women